The following highways are numbered 477:

Canada
Manitoba Provincial Road 477

Japan
 Japan National Route 477

United States
  Louisiana Highway 477
  Maryland Route 477
  Pennsylvania Route 477
  Puerto Rico Highway 477
  Farm to Market Road 477 (Texas)